Victor Albert "Vic" Gonsalves (20 October 1887, Cheribon – 29 August 1922, Amsterdam) was a Dutch amateur association football player. Between 1906 and 1923 he played 86 matches for HBS Craeyenhout. He was nicknamed "de Prins" (the Prince) and known as a midfielder with a decent pass.

He made his debut for the Netherlands in 1909 away to Belgium, which the Dutch won 1–4. A month later he received his second cap in a 4–0 home loss against England. His third and final cap was a 3–2 defeat against Belgium in 1910. Gonsalves was a part of the Dutch Olympic team which won the bronze medal in the 1908 tournament; however, since he was a reserve player and did not play in a match, he was not given a medal.

He suffered with health problems and died at the age of 34.

References

1887 births
1922 deaths
Dutch footballers
Olympic footballers of the Netherlands
Footballers at the 1908 Summer Olympics
Olympic medalists in football
People from Cirebon
Association football midfielders
Medalists at the 1908 Summer Olympics
Olympic bronze medalists for the Netherlands
Netherlands international footballers